Moore Junction is an unincorporated community in Washington County, in the U.S. state of Ohio.

History
The community was named after Hon. Thomas Watson Moore, a railroad contractor who was the original owner of the town site.

References

Unincorporated communities in Washington County, Ohio
Unincorporated communities in Ohio